The Dyle and Bacalan DB-30 was an all-metal, French reconnaissance aircraft built in the late 1920s.

Specifications

References

1920s French military aircraft
DB-30
Aircraft first flown in 1928
Twin-engined tractor aircraft